Al-Sari ibn al-Hakam ibn Yusuf al-Zutti (died November 820) served twice as the Abbasid Caliphate's governor of Egypt.

Career
Al-Sari ibn al-Hakam was of Zutt origin. According to al-Kindi, he was initially an unimportant member of the so-called abna’ al-dawla, the Khurasani troops that formed the mainstay of the Abbasid regime. He came to Egypt in 799 in the retinue of al-Layth ibn al-Fadl, and soon rose to a position of influence within the local abna’. The early years of the 9th century were a time of turmoil for Egypt, where the old-established elites of the original Arab settlers of Fustat losing power to the abna’ and their rivals, the Yemeni tribes of northern Egypt, grouped around Abd al-Aziz ibn al-Wazir al-Jarawi. Taking advantage of the collapse of Abbasid central authority due to the civil war between al-Amin and al-Ma'mun, Abd al-Aziz and al-Sari, with their respective factions, engaged in a vicious struggle for control of the province that by 813 had effectively divided Egypt between them, with the Yemenis holding the north and al-Sari Fustat and the south.

His first tenure as governor of Egypt was short, lasting from April to September 816, but he was reappointed to the post in March 817 and held it until his death in November 820. He was succeeded by his sons as nominal governors of the province. The north remained under Abd al-Aziz's son Ali ibn Abd al-Aziz al-Jarawi (Abd al-Aziz also died in 820), and a first Abbasid attempt at recovering control over the province by sending Khalid ibn Yazid al-Shaybani in 822 was thwarted. Al-Sari's son Ubayd Allah ruled as governor until mid-826, when Abdallah ibn Tahir was named governor of Egypt and re-established Abbasid authority.

According to the Arabist Thierry Bianquis, the succession of al-Sari by his sons signals the first attempt at creating an autonomous dynasty ruling Egypt, heralding the more successful Tulunids and Ikhshidids.

References

Sources 
 
 
 

8th-century births
820 deaths
9th-century Abbasid governors of Egypt
Abbasid governors of Egypt
People from Balkh Province
8th-century Arabs